United Nations Security Council resolution 1514, adopted unanimously on 13 November 2003, after reaffirming Resolution 1479 (2003) on the situation in Côte d'Ivoire (Ivory Coast) and resolutions 1464 (2003) and 1498 (2003), the council extended the mandate of the United Nations Mission in Côte d'Ivoire (MINUCI) until 4 February 2004.

The Security Council reaffirmed the Linas-Marcoussis Agreement and its opposition to attempts to achieve power through unconstitutional means. It stressed the need for all Ivorian parties to participate in the Government of National Reconciliation, resume effective authority throughout the country and commitments towards the disarmament, demobilisation and reintegration programme of former combatants and restructuring of the armed forces. As with previous resolutions, the council commended the Economic Community of West African States (ECOWAS) and French forces for their efforts to promote a peaceful settlement in Côte d'Ivoire.

The Secretary-General Kofi Annan was asked to report to the council by 10 January 2004 on MINUCI's efforts to facilitate peace and stability in Côte d'Ivoire, and on strengthening the United Nations presence in the country.

See also
 Ivorian Civil War
 List of United Nations Security Council Resolutions 1501 to 1600 (2003–2005)
 Opération Licorne

References

External links
 
Text of the Resolution at undocs.org

 1514
 1514
2003 in Ivory Coast
November 2003 events